Methanesulfonic anhydride (Ms2O) is the acid anhydride of methanesulfonic acid. Like methanesulfonyl chloride (MsCl), it may be used to generate mesylates (methanesulfonyl esters).

Preparation & purification
Ms2O may be prepared by the dehydration of methanesulfonic acid with phosphorus pentoxide.
P2O5 + 6 CH3SO3H → 3 (CH3SO2)2O + 2 H3PO4

Ms2O can be purified by distillation under vacuum (distillation of a solid) or by recrystallized from Methyl tert-butyl ether/toluene.

Reactions & Applications in synthesis
Passage of hydrogen chloride through molten Ms2O yields MsCl.

Similar to MsCl, Ms2O can perform mesylation of alcohols to form sulfonates. Use of Ms2O avoids the alkyl chloride, which often appears as a side-product when MsCl is used. Unlike MsCl, Ms2O may not be suitable for mesylation of the unsaturated alcohols.

Examples of mesylation of alcohols with Ms2O:
 Octadecyl methanesulfonate was prepared from octadecanol in pyridine.
 Secondary alcohol at the anomeric carbon of 2,3,4,5-O-Benzyl-protected glucose reacted to form a glycosyl mesylate, which was found to be more stable than its triflate counterpart, in 2,4,6-collidine.

Ms2O also converts amines to sulfonamides.

Aromatic sulfonation

Assisted by Lewis acid catalyst, Friedel-Crafts methylsulfonation of aryl ring can be achieved by Ms2O. In contrast to MsCl, either activated or deactivated benzene derivatives can form the corresponding sulfonatesin satisfactory yields with Ms2O.

Examples of aromatic sulfonation with Ms2O:
 Sulfonation of chlorobenzene resulted in addition of methylsulfonyl group at para and ortho positions (with respect to chloride), with a ratio of 2 to 1, respectively; while reaction with Meta-dichlorobenzene gave monosulfonylated product at C4 position.
 With sulfuric acid, di-aryl sulfones were synthesized.

Esterification
Ms2O catalyzes the esterification of alcohols by carboxylic acids. 2-Naphthyl acetate was prepared from 2-naphthol and glacial (anhydrous) acetic acid in the presence of Ms2O. Both alcohols on ethylene glycol successfully benzoylated with benzoic acid and Ms2O. However, for free alcohols on monosaccharides, the acetylation was not completed.

Oxidation of alcohols
Like Pfitzner–Moffatt oxidation and Swern oxidation, with DMSO, Ms2O can oxidize primary and secondary alcohols to aldehydes and ketones, respectively, in HMPA. This method applies to benzylic alcohol. HMPA may be substituted by dichloromethane but may result in more side-products.

See also
 Methanesulfonyl chloride
 Disulfuric acid
 Sodium pyrosulfate
 Acetic anhydride
 Trifluoromethanesulfonic anhydride

References

Acid anhydrides
Reagents for organic chemistry